The Levisa Fork (also known as the Levisa Fork River or the Levisa Fork of the Big Sandy River) is a tributary of the Big Sandy River, approximately  long, in southwestern Virginia and eastern Kentucky in the United States.

Overview

It rises in the Appalachian Mountains of southwestern Virginia, in eastern Buchanan County, near Grundy. It flows west into Pike County, Kentucky, where it is impounded to form Fishtrap Lake reservoir. After collecting the Russell Fork, it flows northwest through Pikeville and Prestonsburg. The natural course of the river formed a loop surrounding downtown Pikeville, but a massive earthmoving project completed in 1987 rerouted the river to bypass the city. At Paintsville it turns to the north-northeast, flowing through Johnson and Lawrence counties. It joins the Tug Fork from the southwest at Louisa on the West Virginia state line to form the Big Sandy.

The Levisa Fork was historically an important river for log driving. The river is partly navigable for commercial purposes through a series of locks.  In the early 1900s the river was navigable as far as Pikeville.

Variant names, according to the USGS, include Louisa River, Louisa Fork, Lavisa Fork, and West Fork, in addition to Levisa Fork River and Levisa Fork of the Big Sandy River.  The official name according to the USGS is Levisa Fork.  According to Robert F. Collins of the United States Forest Service, 18th-century explorer Dr. Thomas Walker had named the nearby Kentucky River the Louisa River, after Princess Louisa, sister of Prince William Augustus, Duke of Cumberland (Walker had just named the Cumberland River a month or two earlier).  According to George R. Stewart, frontiersmen "forgot" who it was named for and it changed over time to Levisa. An alternate story is that one of Ephraim Vause' daughters, Levicee, was carried away by the Shawnee after the attack on Fort Vause in 1756. She had placed her name on the trunks of beech and sycamore trees as she had been carried along, thus giving her name to Levisa Fork.

On February 28, 1958, a Floyd County school bus tumbled into the Levisa Fork after a collision with a wrecker truck, leading to one of the worst bus disasters in American history.

See also
List of rivers of Kentucky
List of rivers of Virginia

References

 Stewart, George R. "Names on the Land". (1967)
 Collins, Robert F. "A History of the Daniel Boone National Forest". (1975)

Rivers of Kentucky
Rivers of Virginia
Rivers of Johnson County, Kentucky
Rivers of Pike County, Kentucky
Rivers of Floyd County, Kentucky
Rivers of Lawrence County, Kentucky
Rivers of Buchanan County, Virginia